Karen Fort Hood (1952/3 – August 15, 2021) was an American judge. She served as a judge of the 1st District of the Michigan Court of Appeals from 2003 to 2021. She received a Bachelor of Arts degree from Regents College of the University of the State of New York at Albany and a Juris Doctor from the Detroit College of Law.  She died on August 15, 2021.

References

Sources
Court of Appeals bio of Hood

1950s births
2021 deaths
Year of birth uncertain
20th-century American women lawyers
20th-century American lawyers
21st-century American judges
African-American judges
American prosecutors
Detroit College of Law alumni
Michigan Court of Appeals judges
Michigan lawyers
Michigan state court judges
20th-century African-American women
20th-century African-American people
21st-century African-American people
21st-century African-American women
21st-century American women judges